The 2022 Brawo Open was a professional tennis tournament played on clay courts. It was the 28th edition of the tournament which was part of the 2022 ATP Challenger Tour. It took place in Braunschweig, Germany between 4 and 9 July 2022.

Singles main-draw entrants

Seeds

 1 Rankings are as of 27 June 2022.

Other entrants
The following players received wildcards into the singles main draw:
  Pedro Martínez
  Rudolf Molleker
  Marko Topo

The following players received entry into the singles main draw as special exempts:
  Benjamin Hassan
  Zhang Zhizhen

The following players received entry into the singles main draw as alternates:
  Marco Cecchinato
  Sumit Nagal

The following players received entry from the qualifying draw:
  Adrian Andreev
  Oscar José Gutierrez
  Maxime Janvier
  Jozef Kovalík
  Oleksii Krutykh
  Kacper Żuk

The following player received entry as a lucky loser:
  Michael Geerts

Champions

Singles

  Jan-Lennard Struff def.  Maximilian Marterer 6–2, 6–2.

Doubles

  Marcelo Demoliner /  Jan-Lennard Struff def.  Roman Jebavý /  Adam Pavlásek 6–4, 7–5.

References

2022 ATP Challenger Tour
2022
2022 in German tennis
July 2022 sports events in Germany